Louise-Adélaïde Berton-Maisonneuve, stage names Mademoiselle Doligny (1746–1823), was a French stage actress.

She was engaged at the Comédie-Française in 1764. She became a Sociétaires of the Comédie-Française in 1764. She retired in 1783.

References

External links 
   Mademoiselle Doligny, Comédie-Française

1746 births
1823 deaths
18th-century French actresses
French stage actresses